Edward Douglas Cox (February 9, 1923 – January 27, 2011) was an American football player and coach. He served as the head football coach McMurry College in 1955 in between successful runs as a high school football coach at several locations in Texas, including Colorado City, Ballinger and Brownfield.

Head coaching record

College

References

External links
 Texas Sports Hall of Fame profile
 

1923 births
2011 deaths
Angelo State Rams football players
McMurry War Hawks athletic directors
McMurry War Hawks football coaches
SMU Mustangs football players
High school football coaches in Texas
People from Concho County, Texas
Coaches of American football from Texas
Players of American football from Texas